Carlos Delgado (born 1972) is a retired Puerto Rican Major League Baseball player.

Carlos Delgado may also refer to:
Carlos Delgado Chalbaud (1909–1950), Venezuelan military officer and President (1948–1950)
Carlos Delgado (footballer, born 1950), Ecuadorian football goalkeeper
Carlos Delgado Altieri (born 1960), Puerto Rican politician and mayor of Isabela
Carlos Delgado (taekwondo) (born 1970), Nicaraguan taekwondo practitioner
Carlos Delgado (footballer, born 1990), Spanish football centre-back